Extender may refer to:
DOS extender, a technology for bypassing the limitations of the DOS operating systems family
Extender (ink), a transparent material added to printing inks
KC-10 Extender, an air-to-air tanker aircraft
Meat extenders
Media extender
Seafood extender or Surimi
Tele extender, a secondary lens for SLR cameras
Quickdraw or extender, a piece of climbing equipment used by rock and ice climbers to allow the climbing rope to run freely through bolt anchors or other protection while leading	
Extender (set theory)
MG Extender, a pickup truck vehicle built by SAIC Motor and sold in Thailand

See also
Ascender (typography)
Descender